Ye with acute (Е́ е́; italics: Е́ е́) is a letter of the Cyrillic script. In all its forms it looks exactly like the Latin letter E with acute (É é É é).

Usage
, just like any other stressed (accented) Cyrillic vowels are mostly found in East Slavic languages in words like уже́ or в душе́.Words that have letters like  are used mainly if the word is longer than one syllable and are fundamental to use in the East Slavic languages.

Words need to use an accent if a word is longer than one syllable. These letters that are stressed (accented) are fundamental 

Letters like these are important and are needed so that native speakers are able understand the word's meaning and pronunciation and is necessary to put letters like these in languages like this in words to give the word a more meaningful sentence or phrase in texts.

Related letters and other similar characters
E e : Latin letter E
É é : Latin letter E with acute - a Czech, Faroese, Hungarian, Icelandic, Kashubian, and Slovak letter
Ё ё : Cyrillic letter Yo
Є є : Cyrillic letter Ukrainian Ye
Э э : Cyrillic letter E
Cyrillic characters in Unicode

Computing codes
Being a relatively recent letter, not present in any legacy 8-bit Cyrillic encoding, the letter Е́ is not represented directly by a precomposed character in Unicode either; it has to be composed as Е+◌́ (U+0301).

References

Letters with acute
Cyrillic letters with diacritics